Saddleback may refer to:

Fauna 
 Saddleback (bird), two species of New Zealand bird of the family Callaeidae
 North Island saddleback, the North Island species
 South Island saddleback, the South Island species
 Saddleback caterpillar, Acharia stimulea, the larva of a species of moth native to eastern North America
 Saddleback clownfish, Amphiprion polymnus, a black and white species of anemonefish 
 Saddleback toad, a genus of small, colourful toads the family Brachycephalidae
British Saddleback, a modern British breed of domestic pig
Wessex Saddleback, a breed of domestic pig originating in the West Country of England
Angeln Saddleback, a rare breed of domestic pig grown mainly in Schleswig-Holstein, Germany

Geographic features 
 Saddleback Hill, a mountain in Massachusetts
 Saddleback Mountain (disambiguation), a number of mountains worldwide
 Saddleback Point, a headland on the northern coast of Elephant Island, in the South Shetland Islands of Antarctica 
 Saddleback Valley, South Orange County, California, U.S.

Institutions, schools, and organizations 
 Saddleback Church, Lake Forest, California, U.S.
 Saddleback College, Mission Viejo, California, U.S.
 Saddleback High School, Santa Ana, California, U.S.
 Saddleback Valley Unified School District, South Orange County, California, U.S.

Other uses 
 Saddleback roof, usually on a tower, with a ridge and two sloping sides
 Saddleback Maine (ski resort), a ski area on Saddleback Mountain in Rangeley, Maine, U.S.

See also
Saddle (disambiguation)
Lordosis, or saddle back, curvature of the lumbar and cervical regions of the human spine
Saddle point in mathematics
"Saddlebacking", a neologism for a sex act, popularised by the Savage Love newspaper column